Young Communists is a communist youth organization in the Czech Republic, and is a branch of the Communist Party of Bohemia and Moravia. Youth organization is directed by the Youth Commission of the Central Committee of the Communist Party of Bohemia and Moravia. Organization cooperates with the Communist Youth Union, more far-left organization.

References

External links 
 Official website of Youth Communists Mladí komunisté 

Communist Party of Bohemia and Moravia
Youth wings of political parties in the Czech Republic
Youth wings of communist parties